Alectryon (from Ancient Greek: , Alektruṓn , literally meaning "rooster") in Greek mythology, was a young soldier who was assigned by Ares, the god of war, to guard the outside of his bedroom door while the god took part in a love affair with the love goddess Aphrodite. Alectryon however failed at his job when he fell asleep, allowing Helios, the god of the Sun, to see the two lovers and alert Hephaestus, the husband of Aphrodite, thereupon Ares changed him into a rooster in anger, in an etiological myth that attempts to explain the origin of roosters and the reason why they crow each morning at dawn, warning of the Sun approaching. The myth is not mentioned by Homer, who first related the story of Ares and Aphrodite's infidelity in his Odyssey, but rather it was interpolated later by various authors.

Mythology 

According to Lucian, Alectryon was said to have been 'an adolescent boy, beloved of Ares, who kept the god company at drinking parties, overindulged with him, and was his companion in lovemaking'. Ares, fearing that his affair with Aphrodite would be found out and then he would be told on by Helios, the sun god, especially because of his suspicions that he would tell Hephaestus, the god of forgery and the husband of Aphrodite, commanded Alectryon to stand outside his door and watch for Helios, the god of the sun who saw everything, or anyone else, to bear witness to his affair. So Alectryon stood guard outside of his room as the two made love. But one day he fell asleep during watch duty and Helios discovered them the next morning. The sun-god then informed Hephaestus, to the choices of the two, who then created a net to ensnare and then shame them. Furious, Ares punished Alectryon by transforming him into a rooster which never forgets to announce the rising of the sun in the morning by its crowing, his own way of apologizing to Ares for falling asleep on the job, but this failed to make amends.

According to Pausanias, the rooster is Helios' sacred animal, always crowing when he is about to rise.

Interpretation 
Both the words Alectryon and Halcyon might have been corrupted from Halaka, one of the old Persian appellations of the sun. In the 'Vendidad' it is said that the sacred bird Parodars, called by men kahrkatak, raises its voice at the dawn; and in the Bundahishn, the sun is spoken of as Halaka, the cock, the enemy of darkness and evil, which flee before his crowing.

See also 
 Arachne
 Coronis
 Cultural references to chickens
 Echo

Notes

References 
 Lucian, The Dream or the Cock in The Downward Journey or The Tyrant. Zeus Catechized. Zeus Rants. The Dream or The Cock. Prometheus. Icaromenippus or The Sky-man. Timon or The Misanthrope. Charon or The Inspectors. Philosophies for Sale. Translated by A. M. Harmon. Loeb Classical Library 54. Cambridge, MA: Harvard University Press, 1915.
 Pausanias, Pausanias Description of Greece with an English Translation by W.H.S. Jones, Litt.D., and H.A. Ormerod, M.A., in 4 Volumes. Cambridge, MA, Harvard University Press; London, William Heinemann Ltd. 1918. Online version at the Perseus Digital Library.
 Aken, Dr. A.R.A. van. (1961). Elseviers Mythologische Encyclopedie. Amsterdam: Elsevier.
 Bartelink, Dr. G.J.M. (1988). Prisma van de mythologie. Utrecht: Het Spectrum.
 Dictionary of Greek and Roman Biography and Mythology
 Vollmer, Wilhelm. (1874). Wörterbuch der Mythologie. Stuttgart, S. 27–28.
 Pierer's Universal-Lexikon, Band 1. (1857). Altenburg, p. 284.

Metamorphoses into birds in Greek mythology
Mythological galliforms
LGBT themes in Greek mythology
Deeds of Aphrodite
Helios in mythology
Deeds of Ares